Adolf 'Adi' Vogl (4 May 1910 – 9 April 1993) was an Austrian football forward. He played for 20 caps for Austria, with also scoring six goals. Vogl also played for FC Admira Wacker Mödling, Excelsior AC Roubaix and Wiener AC. He participated at the 1934 Mitropa Cup. Vogl was named after lanes in Floridsdorf.

References

External links 
 

1910 births
1993 deaths
Footballers from Vienna
Austria international footballers
Association football forwards
FC Admira Wacker Mödling players
Excelsior AC (France) players
Wiener AC players
Austrian footballers